Nydia Quintero Turbay (born 28 August 1932) is the ex-wife of the 25th president of Colombia, Julio César Turbay Ayala, and served as First Lady of Colombia from 1978 to 1982 when they were still married.

Personal life
She was born on 28 August 1932 in Neiva, Huila to Jorge Quintero Céspedes and Adhalía Turbay Ayala. She is of Lebanese and Basque descent. On 18 May 1948, against the wishes of her family, she married her maternal uncle Julio César Turbay Ayala in a clandestine wedding in a Roman Catholic ceremony at Santa Teresita Church in Bogotá. From their marriage they had four children: Julio César, Diana Consuelo, Claudia, and María Victoria. She divorced her husband in 1983 after his term as president of Colombia and hers as first lady had ended, and remarried the following year in 1984 to Gustavo Balcázar Monzón, her marriage to former President Turbay Ayala was finally annulled by the Catholic Church in 1986.

Honour 
 : Dame Grand Cross of the Royal Order of Isabella the Catholic

See also
 Bertha Puga Martínez

References

1932 births
Living people
People from Huila Department
Nydia
Colombian people of Lebanese descent
Colombian people of Basque descent
First ladies of Colombia
Colombian philanthropists
Recipients of the Order of Isabella the Catholic
Dames Grand Cross of the Order of Isabella the Catholic